Boliviana de Aviación, legally incorporated as Empresa Pública Nacional Estratégica Boliviana de Aviación ("Bolivian National Strategic Aviation Public Company") and commonly known as BoA, is the flag carrier airline of Bolivia and is wholly owned by the country's government. Founded in October 2007 and headquartered in Cochabamba, it operates most of its domestic network out of its primary hub at Jorge Wilstermann International Airport and maintains focus cities at El Alto International Airport and Viru Viru International Airport.

Boliviana de Aviación operates an all-Boeing fleet consisting of Boeing 737s and Boeing 767s, and currently flies to 15 destinations in 5 countries across the Americas and Europe. It is the largest airline in Bolivia in terms of fleet size and passengers carried.

The airline was established as a state-owned enterprise as the successor airline of former flag carrier Lloyd Aéreo Boliviano, which ceased in 2007. Following the demise of AeroSur, Bolivia's second largest airline, BoA became the country's sole main carrier in 2011. In November 2014, Boliviana de Aviación became a full member of the International Air Transport Association.

History

Background and early years 
Boliviana de Aviación (BoA), was founded on 24 October 2007 by the Bolivian government under president Evo Morales, who signed Supreme Decree 29318 into law, establishing the new airline as a strategic state-owned enterprise with the purpose of sustaining the Bolivian air travel market, which had been left exposed during the downturn of Lloyd Aéreo Boliviano (LAB), the country's former flag carrier.    

Proposals from the Bolivian government to establish a new airline quickly became concrete in 2006 when LAB suspended much of its air routes due to financial difficulties and years of mismanagement. LAB had accumulated losses since 1995, at the time of its partial acquisition by Brazilian airline VASP. Its debts approached $180 million dollars and in 2012, it formally ceased operations after 87 years of service. At the time of its demise, Lloyd Aéreo Boliviano was the second oldest airline in South America after Avianca. 

On 29 March 2009, Boliviana de Aviación launched its first scheduled flight between the cities of La Paz, Cochabamba and Santa Cruz de la Sierra using one of the two Boeing 737-300 it acquired that same year.

In 2011, BoA became the main airline in the country after the bankruptcy of AeroSur, Bolivia's second largest carrier.

Expansion

Route expansion

In less than three months of operations (after its inaugural flight), Boliviana de Aviación extended its domestic network serving the city of Tarija. In a gradual time the airline expects to extend its services to the principal cities in Bolivia to consolidate its presence in the national market. The inaugural flight to Tarija was made from El Alto International Airport.

Boliviana de Aviación operates a comprehensive network of scheduled domestic flights, covering all the principal cities of Bolivia. However the airline's fast growth allowed BoA to commence operating international routes.
On 14 May 2010, Boliviana de Aviación received all the operative authorizations for flying internationally inaugurating its first international flight from Cochabamba to Buenos Aires.
In November 2010, the airline inaugurated its second international destination: São Paulo.
BoA currently offers daily non-stop service to Buenos Aires and five weekly frequencies to São Paulo.

Following AeroSur's demise in 2012, BoA became the principal carrier of Bolivia, and leased an Airbus A330 to inaugurate the key link to Madrid, Spain in November 2012. BoA later leased Boeing 767s to operate this flight.

On February 8, 2022, Boliviana de Aviación launched its new destination to Lima, Peru.

Fleet expansion
Boliviana de Aviación started operations with two Boeing 737-300s.
 On 29 September 2009, BoA announced the arrival of its 3rd Boeing 737.
 On 14 April 2010, BoA received its 4th Boeing 737.
 In April 2011, BoA received its 5th Boeing 737, president Evo Morales celebrated the new acquisition and emphasized the positive results in the coverage of the internal market.

Financial and operational performance
On 29 March 2009, Boliviana of Aviación (BoA) made its inaugural flight. To almost a year of the fact, the participation of the state company in the regular aeronautical market came to a close of 50% and utilities to some  US$2.2 million. Some domestic networks have been dominated by the services of BoA. Most of the airline's financial success is due to the 10% reduction of all its fares in domestic flights compared with AeroSur.

Since 2010, the airline began taking leadership in some domestic routes, in decline of the private flag carrier AeroSur.
According to the Authority of Inspection and Social control of Transport and Telecommunications (ATT), Boliviana de Aviación achieved the passengers' biggest quantity in three routes: 
 Cochabamba-Cobija (64%)
 Cochabamba-Sucre (73%)
 Cochabamba-Tarija (93%)

Destinations

Boliviana de Aviación's main hub is in Cochabamba at Jorge Wilstermann International Airport, located in the center of the country. As such, most of the domestic network is operated out of Cochabamba. The airline also maintains two focus cities in La Paz and Santa Cruz de la Sierra. All international flights within South America as well as long-haul services to Madrid and Miami operate out of Viru Viru International Airport in Santa Cruz de la Sierra due to the airport's low altitude compared to La Paz's El Alto International Airport.

Codeshare agreements
Boliviana de Aviación has codeshare agreements with the following airlines (as of December 2022):

 Aerolíneas Argentinas

 Avianca

 Iberia

Fleet

Current fleet

The fleet of Boliviana de Aviación includes the following aircraft as of December 2021:

Former fleet
Since its inception, Boliviana de Aviación has operated the following aircraft:

Antonov An-148
The Bolivian Government and the Russian ambassador were negotiating the acquisition of the Antonov An-148 for official and civil uses. Bolivia was interested in acquiring eight planes, one as the presidential carrier and seven to the state-owned airlines which are Boliviana de Aviación and Transporte Aéreo Militar. According to the negotiation, BoA would have received four planes and TAM three planes of this type.
However, the negotiation depended on the cooperative advances between the Bolivian and Russian governments as regards a credit for US$250 million.  Such plan has been postponed/canceled due to economic and technical unviability.

References

External links

Airlines of Bolivia
Airlines established in 2007
Bolivian companies established in 2007
Government-owned airlines
Latin American and Caribbean Air Transport Association
Bolivian brands
Cochabamba